The first season of The Mary Tyler Moore Show aired on CBS from September 19, 1970 to March 6, 1971. It consisted of 24 half-hour episodes. The first season aired on CBS on Saturday nights at 9:30 p.m. 

Recurring characters introduced in the first season were: Mary Richards (Mary Tyler Moore), Lou Grant (Ed Asner), Murray Slaughter (Gavin MacLeod), Ted Baxter (Ted Knight), Rhoda Morgenstern (Valerie Harper), Phyllis Lindstrom (Cloris Leachman), Bess Lindstrom (Lisa Gerritsen), Ida Morgenstern (Nancy Walker), and Marie Slaughter (Joyce Bulifant). 

The show began in season one as a three-camera show filmed in front of a live audience largely in sequence. Moore said at the time of its debut: "The only kind of TV I would do was one like this, where you shoot it in sequence in front of a live audience."

Prior to the debut of season one, Moore described the concept as follows: "The character is going to be essentially me. Laura Petrie before she got married maybe. I'm going to be a trusting open girl of 30. I would like to be married, but I'm not desperate."

Ratings and awards
During its first season, the show drew an average rating of 20.3 and ranked 22nd among prime time programs.

Season One was nominated for eight Emmy Awards as part of the 23rd Primetime Emmy Awards presented in May 1971. It lost to All in the Family for both Outstanding Comedy Series and Outstanding New Series. Moore was also nominated for Outstanding Actress in a Leading Role in a Comedy Series but lost to Jean Stapleton in her role as Edith Bunker on All in the Family. The show won four awards:
 Edward Asner as Lou Grant for Outstanding Performance by an Actor in a Supporting Role in a Comedy
 Valerie Harper as Rhoda Morgenstern for Outstanding Performance by an Actress in a Supporting Role in a Comedy
 Jay Sandrich for Outstanding Directorial Achievement in Comedy for the episode, "Toulouse Lautrec is One of My Favorite Artists"
 James L. Brooks and Allan Burns for Outstanding Writing Achievement in Comedy for the episode "Support Your Local Mother"
With four Emmy wins in its first season, it led all other comedy shows.

In addition, Moore won the Golden Globe Award in February 1971 for best actress in a musical or comedy series.

Episodes

References

1970 television seasons
1971 television seasons
The Mary Tyler Moore Show